Motta Camastra is a comune (municipality) in the Metropolitan City of Messina in the Italian region Sicily, located about  east of Palermo and about  southwest of Messina.  
 
Motta Camastra borders the following municipalities: Antillo, Castiglione di Sicilia, Francavilla di Sicilia, Graniti.

References

External links
 Official website

Cities and towns in Sicily